The Puerto Rico All Stars were a salsa and Latin Jazz band founded in 1977 by Frankie Gregory. Based in Puerto Rico, the All-Stars were an alternative and rival to the Fania All-Stars created by Johnny Pacheco. From 1977–1979, the Puerto Rico All Stars issued three albums. A fourth was released in 1996.

Band members
 Listed in alphabetical order:

1977 Puerto Rico All Stars
 Aldo Torres (Trombone)
 Andy Montanez (Background vocals)
 Andy Montanez (Vocals)
 Augie Antomattei (Trumpet)
 Derek Cartagena (Compilation)
 Eladio Perez (Conga)
 Elias Lopes (Arranger)
 Elias Lopes (Trumpet)
 Elliot Romero (Background vocals)
 Endel Dueno (Timbales)
 Frankie Gregory (Producer)
 Gunda Merced (Arranger)

1978 Puerto Rico All Stars
 Andy Montanez (Vocals)
 Domingo Santos (Timbales)
 Elias Lopes (Trumpet)
 Gunda Merced (Trombone)
 Juan Antonio Pepin (Conga)
 Juancito Torres (Background vocals)
 Juancito Torres (Producer)
 Juancito Torres (Trumpet)
 Juancito Torres (Vocals)
 Lalo Rodriguez (Vocals)
 Luigi Texidor (Vocals)
 Luiy Maldonada (Trombone)
 Mario Ortiz (Assistant Producer)
 Mario Ortiz (Trumpet)
 Mario Roman (Piano)
 Papo Clemente (Conga)
 Paquito Guzman (Background vocals)
 Pepe Guerrero (Marimba)
 Puerto Rico All Stars (Main Performer)
 Raffi Torres (Trombone)
 Ralph Cartagena (Producer)
 Tito Allen (Vocals)
 Tito Lara (Background vocals)
 Tommy Acevedo (Guitar)
 Tommy Villarini (Trumpet)
 Tony Sanchez (Drums)
 Wison Torres Jr. (Background vocals)
 Yayo el Indio (Vocals)

1979 Puerto Rico All Stars
 Andy Montanez (Vocals)
 Frankie Gregory (Producer)
 Gilberto Santa Rosa (Vocals)
 Jorge Millet (Arranger)
 Lalo Rodriguez (Vocals)
 Papo Sanchez (Vocals)
 Puerto Rico All Stars (Main Performer)
 Sammy Gonzalez (Vocals)
 Tito Allen (Vocals)

1996 Puerto Rico All Stars
 Andy Montanez (Performer)
 Andy Montanez (Vocals)
 Angel Machado (Trumpet)
 Angel Torres (Saxophone)
 Celso Clemente (Bongos)
 Cheguito Encarnacion (Saxophone)
 Cuco Sandova (Photography)
 Cusi Castillo (Trumpet)
 Damaris Mercado (Art Direction)
 Darvel Garcia (Background vocals)
 Darvel Garcia (Performer)
 Darvel Garcia (Vocals)
 Edwin Mulenze (Bass)
 Efrain Hernandez (Bass)
 Ernesto Sanchez (Saxophone)
 Frankie Gregory (Producer)
 Furito Rios (Saxophone)
 Hector Tricoche (Performer)
 Hector Tricoche (Vocals)
 Hector Veneros (Saxophone)
 Jerry Medina (Background vocals)
 Josue Rosado (Background vocals)
 Josue Rosado (Performer)
 Josue Rosado (Vocals)
 Juan "Pericles" Covas (Engineer)
 Juancito Torres (Trumpet)
 Julito Alvarado (Arranger)
 Julito Alvarado (Trumpet)
 Lenny Prieto (Arranger)
 Lito Pena (Arranger)
 Liza Montanez (Performer)
 Liza Montanez (Vocals)
 Louis Garcia (Arranger)
 Louis Garcia (Director)
 Louis Garcia (Vocals)
 Luis Aquino (Trumpet)
 Luis Quevedo (Piano)
 Mario Ortiz (Arranger)
 Mario Ortiz (Trumpet)
 Omar Santiago Macaya (Design)
 Phil Austin (Mastering)
 Piro Rodriguez (Trumpet)
 Primi Cruz (Performer)
 Primi Cruz (Vocals)
 Puerto Rico All Stars (Main Performer)
 Rafael "Tito" DeGracia (Timbales)
 Ralph Mercado (Executive Producer)
 Ray Santos (Arranger)
 Roberto Jimenez (Saxophone)
 Ronald Davidson (Design)
 Tommy Villarini (Trumpet)
 Victor Manuelle (Performer)
 Victor Manuelle (Vocals)
 Willie Lopez (Conga)

2011 Puerto Rico All Stars
 Gunda Merced (Trombone)
 Jesus Sanchez (Engineer)
 Jon Fausty (Engineer)
 Jon Fausty (Mixing)
 Jorge Millet (Arranger)
 Juancito Torres (Trumpet)
 Julio Anidez (Engineer)
 Luigi Texidor (Background vocals)
 Luigi Texidor (Vocals)
 Mario Ortiz (Arranger)
 Mario Ortiz (Trumpet)
 Marvin Santiago (Background vocals)
 Marvin Santiago (Vocals)
 Papo Lucca (Arranger)
 Papo Lucca (Piano)
 Paquito Guzman (Background vocals)
 Paquito Guzman (Vocals)
 Polito Huertas (Bass)
 Puerto Rico All Stars (Main Performer)
 Rafael Ithier (Arranger)
 Raffi Torres (Trombone)
 Ralph Cartagena (Producer)
 Tony Sanchez (Drums)

Discography
 Puerto Rico All Stars: 1977; Re-release: August 10, 1992; Combo Records
 Los Profesionales: 1978; Re-release: August 10, 1992; Combo
 Tribute to the Messiah: 1979; Re-release: September 21, 1993; Combo
 De Regreso: March 5, 1996; Universal/RMM

References and external links
 Puerto Rico All Stars on Myspace
 Article: Rivalries in Latin Music (In Español)
 

Salsa music groups
Puerto Rican musical groups
Musical groups established in 1977